Langford Peak is an isolated peak in Antarctica,  west of the lower part of Reedy Glacier and  northwest of Abbey Nunatak. It was mapped by the United States Geological Survey from ground surveys and U.S. Navy air photos, 1960–63, and was named by the Advisory Committee on Antarctic Names for Lawrence G. Langford, Jr., a builder with the Byrd Station winter party, 1958.

References

External links

Mountains of Marie Byrd Land